José Antonio Culebras Arenas (born 16 January 1979) is a Spanish footballer who plays as a central defender.

Club career
Culebras was born in Puertollano, Province of Ciudad Real. In his professional career, spent mainly in the second division, he played for CD Toledo, CD Numancia, Levante UD and CD Tenerife, being relegated from La Liga with all the clubs except the first, with which he competed in the second tier in the 1999–2000 campaign (also suffering relegation).

Culebras made his debut in the Spanish top flight on 13 May 2001, playing the full 90 minutes for Numancia in a 1–0 home win against CA Osasuna. He amassed division two totals of 247 matches and 11 goals, over ten seasons.

References

External links

1979 births
Living people
People from Puertollano
Sportspeople from the Province of Ciudad Real
Spanish footballers
Footballers from Castilla–La Mancha
Association football defenders
La Liga players
Segunda División players
Segunda División B players
Tercera División players
CD Toledo players
CD Numancia players
Levante UD footballers
CD Tenerife players